Granja de Moreruela is a municipality located in the province of Zamora, Castile and León, Spain. According to the 2004 census (INE), the municipality has a population of 337 inhabitants.

Historical buildings
Moreruela Abbey is the most important building located in this municipality. Dating from the 12th century, Moreruela Abbey is often claimed as the first monastery of the Cistercian Order in Spain.

References

Municipalities of the Province of Zamora